The 2006 season was the 101st season of competitive football in Norway.

Men's football

League season

Promotion and relegation

Tippeligaen

1. divisjon

2. divisjon

3. divisjon

Norwegian Cup

Final

Women's football

League season

Promotion and relegation

Toppserien

1. divisjon

Norwegian Women's Cup

Final
Røa 3–2 Asker

Men's UEFA competitions

Champions League

Qualifying rounds

Second qualifying round

|}

UEFA Cup

Qualifying rounds

First qualifying round

|}

Second qualifying round

|}

First round

|}

Intertoto Cup

Second round

|}

Third round

|}

UEFA Women's Cup

Second qualifying round

Group 2

Matches
 Kolbotn 4–2 RCD Espanyol
 Lehenda-Cheksil Chernihiv 1–2 Kolbotn
 Kolbotn 1–2 Umeå IK

National teams

Norway men's national football team

UEFA Euro 2008 qualifying

Group C

Fixtures and results

Key
 H = Home match
 A = Away match
 N = Neutral site match

Norway women's national football team

Notes and references

 
Seasons in Norwegian football